Balleza is one of the 67 municipalities of Chihuahua, in northern Mexico. The municipal seat lies at Mariano Balleza.

As of 2010, the municipality had a total population of 17,672, up from 16,325 as of 2005.

The municipality had 594 localities, the largest of which (with 2010 populations in parentheses) were: Mariano Balleza (2,087), classified as urban, and Ejido el Vergel (2,008), classified as rural.

References

Municipalities of Chihuahua (state)